Horsens railway station ( or Horsens Banegård) is a railway station serving the town of Horsens in East Jutland, Denmark.

The station is located on the Fredericia-Aarhus railway line from Fredericia to Aarhus. It opened in 1868 and was moved to its current position in 1929. It offers direct InterCity services to Copenhagen, Hamburg, Aarhus and Aalborg as well as regional train services to Aarhus and Fredericia. The train services are operated by the railway company DSB.

History 
Horsens station was opened in 1868 with the opening of the Fredericia-Aarhus railway line from Fredericia to Aarhus. In 1929, the station was moved to its current position.

Operations 
The train services are operated by the railway company DSB. The station offers direct InterCity services to Copenhagen, Hamburg, Aarhus and Aalborg as well as regional train services to Aarhus and Fredericia.

See also
 List of railway stations in Denmark

References

Citations

Bibliography

External links

 Banedanmark – government agency responsible for maintenance and traffic control of most of the Danish railway network
 DSB – largest Danish train operating company
 Danske Jernbaner – website with information on railway history in Denmark

Railway stations opened in 1868
Railway stations in the Central Denmark Region
1868 establishments in Denmark
Knud Tanggaard Seest railway stations
Railway stations in Denmark opened in the 19th century